Louisa (originally named Louisa Court House) is a town in Louisa County, Virginia, United States. The population was 1,555 at the 2010 census. It is the county seat of Louisa County.

History
Louisa Court House was named because of the county courthouse constructed in 1742, near the intersection of Courthouse Road (now SR 208) and Main Street/Louisa Road (now SR-22/US-33). The village of Louisa Court House had been the county seat for over a century when it became a strategic location during the American Civil War for Virginia's supply and communication lines.

Chartered in 1836 as the Louisa Railroad by the Virginia General Assembly, the Virginia Central Railroad mainline passed through the village. On 10 June 1864, thousands of men and horses of Gen. Fitzhugh Lee's cavalry division camped around the courthouse prior to the Battle of Trevilian Station. The VCR merged into the Chesapeake and Ohio Railroad in 1868 (reorganized as the Chesapeake and Ohio Railway in 1878). The C&O operated the mainline through Louisa over one hundred years, until the Chessie System merged into CSX in the 1980s.

The incorporated Town of Louisa was created by Act of the General Assembly in 1873. Many businesses found advantage in locating near the mainline, especially heavy industries that could transport using the railroad. As the road infrastructure improved and especially since the 1956 development of the interstate highway system's I-64, local businesses transport mainly via semi-truck using US 33.

East of the Town of Louisa on Jeff Davis Highway is the Cooke Industrial Rail Park, a 1400 acre contiguous tract of land with over 1 mile of rail frontage, served by CSX and Buckingham Branch Railroad.

Historic Places
There are many places of local historic interest and some that are of national significance: Bloomington, Boxley Place, the 1905 Louisa County Courthouse, and Louisa High School are listed on the National Register of Historic Places.

Geography
Louisa is located at  (38.024057, −78.001584).

According to the United States Census Bureau, the city has a total area of 1.8 square miles (4.7 km), of which 1.8 square miles (4.7 km) is land and 0.55% is water.

Climate

Demographics

At the 2000 census there were 1,401 people, 584 households, and 331 families in the town. The population density was 766.8 people per square mile (295.6/km). There were 620 housing units at an average density of 339.4 per square mile (130.8/km).  The racial makeup of the town was 66.81% White, 29.48% African American, 0.79% Native American, 0.71% Asian, 0.79% from other races, and 1.43% from two or more races. Hispanic or Latino of any race were 1.43%.

Of the 584 households 30.0% had children under the age of 18 living with them, 35.6% were married couples living together, 16.4% had a female householder with no husband present, and 43.3% were non-families. 37.0% of households were one person and 18.3% were one person aged 65 or older. The average household size was 2.25 and the average family size was 2.93.

The age distribution was 24.8% under the age of 18, 7.9% from 18 to 24, 28.5% from 25 to 44, 19.2% from 45 to 64, and 19.6% 65 or older. The median age was 38 years. For every 100 females, there were 81.5 males. For every 100 females age 18 and over, there were 73.1 males.

The median household income was $29,519 and the median family income  was $42,396. Males had a median income of $27,578 versus $23,188 for females. The per capita income for the town was $17,763. About 14.7% of families and 18.7% of the population were below the poverty line, including 27.9% of those under age 18 and 17.0% of those age 65 or over.

Points of interest 

Louisa is home to the North Anna Nuclear Generating Station which produces electricity and offers jobs for the county's inhabitants. The warm water produced from the power plant and discharged into the water of Lake Anna creates what some call Central Virginia's best fishing.

The community has been in Louisa since 1967.

The 2011 Virginia earthquake had its epicenter just 7 miles (11 kilometers) south-southeast of Louisa. This quake registered 5.8 magnitude, and caused the evacuations of buildings on Capitol Hill in Washington, D.C., as well as New York City and was felt as far north as Canada.

Public services 
Jefferson-Madison Regional Library is the regional library system that provides services to the citizens of Louisa.

Notable people
Kerry Wynn, defensive end for the Cincinnati Bengals

References

External links
 

 
Towns in Louisa County, Virginia
Towns in Virginia
County seats in Virginia